Dreams of Love is a 1947 French historical drama film directed by Christian Stengel and starring Pierre Richard-Willm, Mila Parély and Annie Ducaux. It portrays the life of the composer Franz Liszt.

The film's sets were designed by the art directors Alexandre Trauner and Robert Gys. Some filming took place at the 
Villa Besnard in Talloires.

Cast
 Pierre Richard-Willm as Franz Liszt
 Mila Parély as George Sand
 Annie Ducaux as Countess Marie D'Agoult
 Louis Seigner as Le comte d'Agoult  
 Jules Berry as Belloni  
 Daniel Lecourtois as Ronchaud  
 Jean d'Yd as Cadolle  
 Guy Decomble as Hurau
 Lise Berthier as La mère de Liszt
 Albert Broquin as Un ouvrier chez Erard
 Lise Florelly as La patronne
 Robert Le Béal as Le major Pictet
 Félix Marten
 Jean-Pierre Mocky 
 Geneviève Morel as La servante
 Lucy Valnor as Fillette
 André Varennes as Erard
 Roger Vincent as Un invité

References

Bibliography 
 Rège, Philippe. Encyclopedia of French Film Directors, Volume 1. Scarecrow Press, 2009.

External links 
 

1947 films
1940s biographical drama films
1940s historical drama films
French biographical drama films
French historical drama films
1940s French-language films
Films directed by Christian Stengel
Films set in the 19th century
Biographical films about musicians
Films about classical music and musicians
Films about composers
Films about pianos and pianists
Pathé films
French black-and-white films
Cultural depictions of George Sand
1947 drama films
1940s French films